Frank Pasemann (born 21 April 1961) is a German politician (formerly AfD). He got excluded from the party in 2020. Pasemann has served as a member of the Bundestag from the state of Saxony-Anhalt since 2017.

Biography 
Pasemann is part of the ultra-nationalistic group Der Flügel within AfD. According to Süddeutsche Zeitung even if Pasemann was not that present in public, he is described by insiders as an important link to right-wing extremists outside the AfD.

Pasemann was member of the GDR Liberal Democratic Party of Germany and later of the Free Democratic Party. Later he switched to AfD. He became member of the Bundestag after the 2017 German federal election. He is a member of the Committee for Family, Senior Citizens, Women and Youth.
In August 2020, Pasemann was expelled from the AfD by the Landesschiedsgericht (arbitration tribunal) of the party branch in the state of Saxony-Anhalt. Pasemann was accused of antisemitism and other misdemeanors.

An AfD district association in Saxony-Anhalt presented Paseman as a non-party direct candidate for the mayoral election in April 2022 in Magdeburg.

References

External links 

 Bundestag biography 

1961 births
Living people
Members of the Bundestag for Saxony-Anhalt
Members of the Bundestag 2017–2021
Members of the Bundestag for the Alternative for Germany
Politicians affected by a party expulsion process